Bodde is a surname. Notable people with the surname include:

 Derk Bodde (1909–2003), American sinologist and historian
 Ferrie Bodde (born 1982), Dutch footballer and coach
 Peter W. Bodde (born 1954), American diplomat, son of William
 William Bodde Jr. (1931–2020), American diplomat